Hermione Hoby is a British author, journalist, and cultural critic. She is the author of the 2018 novel Neon in Daylight.

Early and personal life
Hoby was born and raised in South London. She is named for the character Hermione from Shakespeare's The Winter's Tale. She studied at Cambridge University and graduated in English literature.

Career
Hoby worked at The Guardian until moving to New York City in 2010 to become a freelance culture writer. She has profiled writers, actors, musicians, and other public figures, including Toni Morrison, Naomi Campbell, Meryl Streep, and others.

In 2016, Hoby began writing "Stranger of the Week", a column for The Awl, in which she observed the wider state of culture, life, and politics based on character studies culled from real-life encounters.

Neon in Daylight
Published on 1 January 2018 by Catapult, Hoby's debut novel, Neon in Daylight, is set in New York during the months leading up to Hurricane Sandy. The book follows the intertwining lives of a middle-aged writer, his rebellious daughter, and a newly transplanted English woman. Reviewing the novel in the Los Angeles Review of Books, Bradley Babendir called Neon in Daylight "luminous and wonderful...[Hoby's] style has a delicious, raucous quality." In The New York Times, Parul Sehgal compared Neon in Daylight to Joan Didion's Play It as It Lays, saying "precision — of observation, of language — is Hoby's gift. Her sentences are sleek and tailored. Language molds snugly to thought." The book has been named recommended reading by Vanity Fair, Fast Company, and Bustle.

References

British women novelists
Living people
21st-century British women writers
The Guardian journalists
British expatriates in the United States
1985 births
Alumni of the University of Cambridge
Writers from London